USS Genevieve (SP-459) was a United States Navy ferry in commission from 1918 to 1919.
 
Genevieve was built as a private steam yacht of the same name in 1895 at New Bedford, Massachusetts. She later was converted for use as a charter fishing boat.

On 19 September 1918, the U.S. Navy purchased Genevieve from her owners, F. H. Myer and A. S. Smith of New York City, for use as a section patrol vessel during World War I, although the war ended on 11 November 1918 before her commissioning . However, she was commissioned as USS Genevieve (SP-459) on 9 December 1918.

Assigned to the Naval Overseas Transportation Service in the 3rd Naval District, Genevieve operated as a water taxi in the New York City area throughout her nine-month naval career, often carrying civilian working parties and their gear from dock to dock and ship to shore.

Genevieve was decommissioned on 9 August 1919 and sold on 20 November 1919 to Marvin Briggs, Inc. of New York City.

References
 
 NavSource Online: Section Patrol Craft Photo Archive: Genevieve (SP 459)

Auxiliary ships of the United States Navy
Ships built in New Bedford, Massachusetts
1895 ships